Jodoigne-Souveraine is a village of Wallonia and a district of the municipality of Jodoigne, located in the province of Walloon Brabant, Belgium. 

The village lies next to the Great Gette.

Jodoigne
Former municipalities of Walloon Brabant